The Mark 24 mine (also known as FIDO or Fido) is an air-dropped anti-submarine warfare weapon (ASW) incorporating passive acoustic homing system and torpedo integration. It was used by the United States, the British and Canadian forces during the Second World War and entered service in March 1943 and remained in use with the US Navy until 1948. Approximately 4,000 torpedoes were produced, with 340 ultimately being deployed during the war. Two-hundred and four torpedoes were launched against submarine targets, with 37 Axis submarines being sunk and a further 18 damaged. The deceptive name of "Mark 24 mine" was deliberately chosen for security purposes, to conceal the true nature of the weapon.

Background
The concept of a torpedo which would "home" on its target had been studied by torpedo designers as far back as the First World War. While the concept was  interesting, implementation had to await a better understanding of the physics of sound generation and transmission in the sea and the development of the technology from which such a torpedo could be designed and constructed. During World War II, German submarines were equipped with electrically driven acoustic homing torpedoes for which development had started as far back as 1933. The Falke T-4 and Zaunkönig T-5 torpedoes entering service in 1943 were designed to attack surface ships and ran at a preset depth. A similar torpedo (MK28) entered US submarine service in 1944. 

While effective against surface ships, the MK28 was of limited use  against submarines, due to its inability to track and adjust to changes in both depth and azimuth. The design of Fido enabled it to meet the size, weight, and aerial launch specifications associated with air-drop water entry, in addition to addressing the shortcomings of earlier torpedo tracking and control systems.

Development

The US Navy began studies into an air-dropped anti-submarine torpedo in late 1941. Based on a formal set of requirements, Harvard Underwater Sound Lab (HUSL) and Bell Telephone Labs began development in December 1941. These projects later became the Office of Scientific Research and Development project 61 (FIDO).

Both Bell Labs and HUSL proceeded with parallel development of torpedoes, with a complete exchange of information between them. Western Electric was to develop a lightweight, shock resistant, 48 volt lead-acid battery capable of providing 110 amps for 15 minutes. General Electric was to design and fabricate propulsion and steering motors and to investigate an active acoustic homing system. David Taylor Model Basin was to assist with hydrodynamics and propulsion.

The guidance system consisted of four hydrophones placed around the midsection of the torpedo, connected to a vacuum tube-based sound processing array. A Bell Labs proportional navigation and HUSL non-proportional steering system had been demonstrated by July 1942.

An existing Mark 13 torpedo provided the body of the torpedo, it was modified by shortening the hull, reducing the diameter, reducing the weight, and designing a hemispherical nose section to carry the explosive charge, and a conical tail section with four stabilizing fins and rudders and a single propeller. The effect of these modifications was to produce a relatively short, "fat" torpedo.

In June 1942, the US Navy decided to take the torpedo into production, even though there was still major testing work remaining on the project, including air-drop testing. The Bell Labs version of the guidance system was selected for production, with proportional homing. Testing of the pre-production prototypes continued on into December 1942, and the US Navy received the first production models in March 1943.

Initially 10,000 torpedoes were ordered, but the FIDO proved so effective that the order was reduced to 4,000. The torpedoes ended up costing $1,800 each.

Description
Upon water entry, the FIDO performed a circular search at a predetermined depth controlled by a bellows and pendulum system. This continued until the potential target's 24 kHz acoustic signal detected by the hydrophones exceeded a predetermined threshold level, at which point control was then shifted to the passive acoustic proportional homing system.  Initially the torpedoes were set to search for targets at depths of 50 feet (15 m), this was later changed to 150 feet (45 m). To prevent the torpedo from accidentally attacking surface ships, it resumed its circling search if it rose above a depth of 40 feet (12 m).

The torpedo's relatively low speed was kept secret because, although U-boats could not outrun the torpedo when submerged, they could outrun it on the surface.

Combat history
On 13 May an RAF Coastal Command Liberator B/86 had attacked a U-boat with a FIDO, but this vessel, was only damaged, sinking the following day from damage received. One of these vessels was the first U-boat sinking achieved using a FIDO. During its lifetime, the torpedo sank a total of 37 submarines, achieving an effectiveness of about 18%, compared with 9.5% for aircraft-launched depth charges.

US Navy OEG Study No. 289, 12 August 1946 provides the following data related to Mark 24 effectiveness:

General characteristics
Diameter: 19 inches (48 cm).
Length: 84 inches (2.13 m).
Weight: 680 lb (308 kg).
 Warhead: 92 lb (41.7 kg) HBX high explosive.
 Propulsion: 5 hp (3.7 kW) electric motor driving a single propeller, powered by a 48 volt lead acid battery.
 Speed and endurance:  for 10 minutes, giving a range of about 4,000 yards (3,700 m)
 Homing system: 4 piezoelectric hydrophones operating at 24 kHz and vacuum tube signal processing system with proportional steering.
 Maximum drop altitude: 200 to 300 ft (60 m to 90 m)
 Maximum aircraft launch speed: 120 knots (220 km/h).

Variants
 The Mark 27 torpedo (Cutie) was developed for submarine use against surface vessels. It saw service in the Pacific war from the summer of 1944. Lieutenant Commander Carter L. Bennett's Sea Owl achieved the Mark 27's first combat success, damaging a Japanese patrol vessel in the Yellow Sea in November.

Notes

Sources
 http://uboat.net/allies/technical/fido.htm
 https://web.archive.org/web/20060224092332/http://www.navytorpedo.com/html/legacy/USNT4.htm
 Blair, Clay, Jr. Hitler's U-Boat War: The Hunters, 1939-1942. 
 Blair, Clay, Jr. Silent Victory. Bantam, 1976.
 Paul Kemp  : U-Boats Destroyed ( 1997) 
 Axel Niestle  : German U-Boat Losses during World War II  (1998) 

Torpedoes
Torpedoes of the United States
World War II naval weapons
Aerial torpedoes
World War II weapons of the United States
Weapons and ammunition introduced in 1942